Slaveyko Arsov Kikiritkov, known also as Slavko Arsov (Bulgarian/Macedonian: Славко Арсов), was a Macedonian Bulgarian revolutionary, leader of the Internal Macedonian-Adrianople Revolutionary Organization (IMARO) for the region of Resen. He is regarded an ethnic Macedonian in North Macedonia.

Biography
Slaveyko Arsov was born in 1878 in the village of Novo Selo (now part of Štip Municipality in the Republic of North Macedonia), then part of the Kosovo Vilayet of the Ottoman Empire. He finished his elementary education in his village. He studied in Skopje, and later, during 1897-1898, in Sofia. His brother Mihail became a member of the revolutionary organization IMARO at the time when Dame Gruev and Gotse Delchev worked as teachers in Štip. Slaveyko Arsov joined the IMARO in 1896. At the end of 1899, Slaveyko Arsov settled in Kičevo, where he developed revolutionary activity. He spent one year in prison, and in the autumn of 1901 he became a freedom fighter in Marko Lerinski’s revolutionary band. With Marko Lerinski and Gotse Delchev, he toured the regions of Kastoria, Edessa, Florina and Bitola.

Together with Captain Toma Davidov, he participated in the activities of the inspection band. In February 1902, Slaveyko Arsov became a member of an independent revolutionary band in the region of Bitola, and in the summer of the same year, in the region of Resen. In Resen, he and Nikola Kokarev,(bg) created the first committees of the organization. At the Congress of Smilevo, he was a delegate of the Resen revolutionary region, together with Aleksandar Panayotov, Velyan Iliev and Nikola Kokarev. Before the Ilinden-Preobrazhenie Uprising, Toma Nikolov and Donka Ushlinova joined the band of Slaveyko Arsov. He participated in the Ilinden-Preobrazhenie Uprising, after which he moved in Bulgaria.

In 1904, he came back to  Ottoman Macedonia, together with the revolutionary bands led by Atanas Babata and Stoyan Donski. On June 9, 1904, they were betrayed by local Serbomans near the village of Gorno Gyugyantsi, Kratovo region, and were surrounded by Turkish military. After 6 hours of battle, the freedom fighters began to withdraw. The leader Stoyan Donski and 20 freedom fighters were killed. Slaveyko Arsov, who was injured, took his own life.

Gallery

References 
 

1870s births
1904 deaths
People from Kosovo vilayet
Macedonian Bulgarians
Members of the Internal Macedonian Revolutionary Organization
Bulgarian revolutionaries
1904 suicides